Bljedi Bardic (born January 10, 1992) is a Montenegrin soccer player of Albanian descent who currently plays for New Amsterdam FC in the National Independent Soccer Association.

Born in Bar, Montenegro, where Bardic played youth soccer for OFK Bar where he was leading goalscorer. After spending 2 years at OFK Bar youth team, Bardic moved in Shkodër, Albania where he played for KF Vllaznia Shkodër for 1 year. Bardic moved back in Bar and signed his professional contract with Senior Team OFK Bar

Career

Professional
On 6 September 2011, Bardic signed his first contract with OFK Bar. He played 20 games and scored 7 goals. Bardic continued his career in the United States of America where he signed for Clarkstown SC Eagles of the National Premier Soccer League. With 86 goals, he is the team's all-time leading goal scorer.

On May 27, 2016, Bardic signed for Puerto Rico FC. In his second appearance Bardic scored the winning goal against the Fort Lauderdale Strikers and he was named man of the match.

On January 15, 2021, after four years in the New York Cosmos organization, Bardic signed for New Amsterdam FC of the National Independent Soccer Association.

References

External links
NASL profile

1992 births
Living people
People from Bar, Montenegro
Association football forwards
Montenegrin footballers
OFK Bar players
FC Motown players
Puerto Rico FC players
New York Cosmos B players
New York Cosmos (2010) players
New Amsterdam FC players
Montenegrin Second League players
North American Soccer League players
National Premier Soccer League players
National Independent Soccer Association players
Montenegrin expatriate footballers
Expatriate soccer players in the United States
Montenegrin expatriate sportspeople in the United States
Albanians in Montenegro